Miss Russia 2018 was the 26th Miss Russia pageant, held in the concert hall Barvikha Luxury Village in Moscow on 14 April 2018. Fifty contestants from around Russia competed for the crown. Polina Popova of Sverdlovsk Oblast crowned her successor Yulia Polyachikhina of Chuvashia at the end of the event. The competition was hosted by Maxim Privalov and Vera Krasova.

Yulia Polyachikhina represented Russia at Miss Universe 2018 in Bangkok, Thailand. The second runner up, Natalya Stroeva entered Miss World 2018 in Sanya, China.

Results

Placements

§ – Qualified to the Top 20 via the fan vote.

Special awards

Contestants

Judges
Igor Chapurin – fashion designer
Dmitry Malikov – actor, singer, and composer
Vladimir Matetsky – composer, producer, and radio host
Denis Rodkin – ballet dancer at the Bolshoi Theatre
Ksenia Sukhinova – Miss Russia 2007 and Miss World 2008

References

External links

2018 beauty pageants
2018 in Moscow
April 2018 events in Russia
Miss Russia